The Asahi Pentax series, by the , was a pivotal development in modern photography. They were the earliest Pentax cameras.

Background 

In 1957, the Asahi Optical Company (later "Pentax") introduced the Pentax, a 35 mm Single-lens reflex camera (SLR) camera which was so well received that it influenced the design of 35 mm SLRs worldwide for years to come.

The Pentax and its later development and likewise classic 1964 Pentax Spotmatic allowed Asahi Optical Company to develop into a photographic multinational company, eventually leading the company to rename itself "Pentax" after its seminal product.

Features and market impact 
The Asahi Pentax of 1957 featured:

 Rapid-wind film advance lever. Earlier 35 mm SLRs, with the sole exception of Exakta's left-handed lever, had knob winders;
 Film rewind crank, likewise a first for 35 mm SLRs;
 Instant mirror return, unique to the Pentax and its immediate predecessor, the Asahiflex IIb;
 Microprism focusing aids on the focus screen, unique to the Pentax.

Moreover, the Pentax placed controls in locations that would become standard on 35 mm SLRs from all manufacturers, such as the right-handed rapid wind lever, the bottom right mounted rewind release. It also had a film speed reminder around the film rewind crank, a location that remained standard until the dial went from being merely a reminder to the photographer to actually controlling the light meter built into later SLRs.

The two photographic giants, Canon and Nikon did not introduce their own SLR cameras until 1959 with the Canonflex and the F-series respectively. By contrast, the Pentax offered these features at a relatively low price, introducing many photographers to 35 mm SLR photography.

The Pentax became so dominant that the 42 mm screw lens mount used on the Pentax and Pentax Spotmatic become known as the "Pentax universal screw mount" although it had actually been introduced by Praktica in 1949. Previously most makes of camera used proprietary mounts; the use of this mount by other manufacturers allowed owners of M42-equipped cameras to mount lenses from Zeiss, Yashica, Soligor, Vivitar, Topcon, Sigma, Chinon, and many more as well as Asahi's own highly regarded Takumar lenses. These lenses had no other communication with the camera than a diaphragm interface which allowed focusing at full aperture, the lens being stopped down to working aperture on pressing the shutter release. Later cameras required more lens-body communication to implement shutter priority exposure, program auto exposure, and finally, autofocusing, and different manufacturers used different interfaces, ending the era of interoperability. In 1975 Pentax introduced the K mount to replace the 42 mm screw lens mount used so successfully until then.

See also
Asahiflex
History of the single-lens reflex camera
Pentax

References

History of photography
Pentax SLR cameras
SLR cameras
135 film cameras
Japanese inventions